The Open Internacional de San Sebastián is a tournament for professional female tennis players played on outdoor clay courts. The event is classified as a $60,000 ITF Women's World Tennis Tour tournament and has been held in San Sebastián, Spain, since 2022.

Past finals

Singles

Doubles

External links 
 ITF search

ITF Women's World Tennis Tour
Clay court tennis tournaments
Tennis tournaments in Spain
2022 establishments in Spain
Recurring sporting events established in 2022